Trogiomorpha is one of the three major suborders of barklice, booklice, and parasitic lice in the order Psocodea (formerly Psocoptera), alongside Troctomorpha and Psocomorpha. There are about 8 families and more than 430 described species in Trogiomorpha. Trogiomorpha is widely agreed to be the earliest diverging of the three suborders, and retains the most primitive characteristics.

Internal phylogeny
Here is a cladogram showing the phylogeny of Psocodea, showing the position of Trogiomorpha:

Families
Psocomorpha contains 3 infraorders and 5 extant (living) families, as well as three identified extinct families:
Atropetae
Archaeatropidae Baz & Ortuño, 2000
Empheriidae Baz & Ortuño, 2000
Lepidopsocidae Enderlein, 1903 (scaly-winged barklice)
Psoquillidae Lienhard & Smithers, 2002 (bird nest barklice)
Trogiidae Roesler, 1944 (granary booklice)
Psyllipsocetae
Psyllipsocidae Lienhard & Smithers, 2002 (cave barklice)
Prionoglaridetae (paraphyletic)
Prionoglarididae Azar, Huang & Nel, 2017 (large-winged psocids)
Unplaced:

Cormopsocidae Yoshizawa & Lienhard, 2020

References

Further reading

 

 
Psocoptera
Insect suborders
Psocodea